Jürgen Kissner (18 August 1942 – 18 May 2019) was a German cyclist. He won the silver medal in the Team pursuit in the 1968 Summer Olympics.

References

External links
 
 

1942 births
2019 deaths
German male cyclists
Cyclists at the 1968 Summer Olympics
Olympic cyclists of West Germany
Olympic silver medalists for West Germany
Olympic medalists in cycling
People from Luckau
Cyclists from Brandenburg
Medalists at the 1968 Summer Olympics
People from Bezirk Cottbus
East German male cyclists
East German defectors
East German emigrants to West Germany
Cyclists from Cologne